The Creeping Nobodies were a Canadian rock band formed in Toronto, Ontario in 2001. They played their final gig in 2009.

History

The Creeping Nobodies began as a one-off performance for a tribute night to the UK band The Fall, and were put together by Derek Westerholm.   The tribute night was held on September 21, 2001 at the El Mocambo club in Toronto, and the band name "The Creeping Nobodies" came from the name of a fictitious band mentioned on a Fall record sleeve. Immediately afterwards, the band became its own entity, investigating a wider range of musical influences.

The band released many of their records on Blocks Recording Club (sometimes referred to simply as [][][][][][] Recording), including Sound of Joy, recorded with Wharton Tiers, and a 2007 split 12" with the band Anagram. Blocks was a worker co-operative which also released records by Final Fantasy, Ninja High School, Katie Stelmanis, Lenin I Shumov, The Hank Collective, Fucked Up, and The Phonemes, among others.  Other Creeping Nobodies  CD and vinyl releases appeared on Deleted Art, fromSCRATCH, Bloodworks Music, Kosher Rock Records, and on a number of compilation albums.

The band line-up changed a number of times over the years, the most stable occurring between 2004-2007 consisting of Westerholm, Uher, Amos, McDonough and Richardson. In 2007 Westerholm himself left prior to the band's last recordings and final tour in Europe.  The band's last performance occurred in May, 2009, and at that time The Creeping Nobodies were Dennis Amos, Sarah Richardson, Valerie Uher and Matthew McDonough.

Discography

Albums
Augurs & Auspices (Deleted Art, 2007)
Sound of Joy (Blocks, 2006)
Stop Movement Stop Loss (Blocks, 2004)

EPs and mini-albums
Silver & Golden Apples 3" cdep (Akashic Records, 2007)
Split cdep w/ Miranda (fromSCRATCH, 2007)
Split 12" LP w/ Anagram (Blocks/Dead Astronaut, 2006)
Half-Saboteur 12" LP (Bloodworks, 2005)
I-X-U cd (Kosher Rock, 2002)

Splits
 Cockles 7" w/ These Are Powers (2008) Army of Bad Luck

Other appearances
Galactic Dossier Issue No. 8 CD Compilation (2009) (Song "Beltane")
Suoni Il Per Popolo Festival Compilation (2006) (Song "Hollow Stems, A Hunter's Will")
Perverted By Mark E. - A Tribute to The Fall Zick Zack Compilation (2004) (Song "Wings")
Toronto is Great! Blocks Compilation (2004) (Song "Heatseek")
In The Film They Made Us A Little More Articulate Escape Goat Records Compilation (2003) (Song "Cold Hands")
Rosco Re-define Rosco Magazine Sampler (2002) (Song "State")

See also

Music of Canada
Canadian rock
List of bands from Canada
List of Canadian musicians
:Category:Canadian musical groups

References

External links
Thecreepingnobodies.com
Deletedart.org
blocksblocksblocks.com
Review of Creeping Nobodies on their UK Tour

Musical groups established in 2001
Canadian indie rock groups
Canadian art rock groups
Musical groups from Toronto
2001 establishments in Ontario
Musical groups disestablished in 2009
2009 disestablishments in Canada